Chkhaidze is a Georgian surname. Notable people with the surname include:

Gennady Chkhaidze (born 1974), Georgian wrestler
Gia Chkhaidze (born 1970), Georgian football player
Giorgi Chkhaidze (born 1982), Georgian rugby union player
Zaza Chkhaidze (born 1974), Georgian major general

Georgian-language surnames